Karayayla can refer to:

 Karayayla, Kale
 Karayayla, Tarsus